The 13th Central Committee of the Communist Party of Vietnam (CPV) has been in session since the conclusion of the 13th National Congress in 2021. It elected, at its 1st Plenary Session, the Politburo, about half of the membership of the Secretariat and the Central Inspection Commission of the 13th term.

Plenums
The Central Committee is not a permanent institution. Instead, it convenes plenary sessions between party congresses. When the CC is not in session, decision-making powers are delegated to the internal bodies of the CC itself; that is, the Politburo and the Secretariat. None of these organs are permanent bodies either; typically, they convene several times a month.

Organisation

Officers

Central-level organs

Committees directly under the Central Committee

Composition

Members

Alternates

References

Citations

Bibliography

External links
Party Central Committee members announced

2021 in Vietnam
13th Central Committee of the Communist Party of Vietnam